Christmas Card from a Painted Lady is a studio album by Kikki Danielsson, released on 4 November 2016. It is a Christmas album.

Track listing

Contributors
Kikki Danielsson - vocals
Sören Karlsson - guitar, producer
Gunnar Frick - piano, organ, accordion, pedal steel guitar
Stefan Bellnäs - piano, organ, accordion, pedal steel guitar
Johan Håkansson - drums, percussion
Staffan Johansson - guitar

Chart positions

References

2016 Christmas albums
Christmas albums by Swedish artists
Kikki Danielsson albums